Japanese Village may refer to:

Japanese Village (Ayutthaya), a former settlement and museum in Ayutthaya, Thailand
Japanese Village (Dugway Proving Ground), a US Army weapons test facility
Japanese Village, Knightsbridge, a 1885–1887 exhibition in Knightsbridge, London
Japanese Village and Deer Park, a defunct amusement park in Buena Park, California
Japanese Village Plaza, a shopping area in Little Tokyo, Los Angeles

See also
List of villages in Japan
Nihonmachi, Japanese communities in early modern East and Southeast Asia